Mount Pleasant is a neighbourhood in the city of Vancouver, British Columbia, Canada, stretching from Cambie Street to Clark Drive and from Great Northern Way and 2nd, to 16th and Kingsway. The neighbourhood, once characterized as working-class, has undergone a process of gentrification since the early 1990s, including the area around the Main Street and Broadway intersection.

The neighbourhood is served by the Canada Line, an extension of SkyTrain from Downtown Vancouver to Vancouver International Airport.

Mount Pleasant is known as one of the more up and coming neighbourhoods, especially in the communities surrounding Vancouver's downtown peninsula. Many first-time homeowners and young professionals, as well as a growing number of families, call Mount Pleasant home.  It is also home to a number of artists and writers, including CBC personalities Ian Hanomansing and Tod Maffin, The Tyee editor David Beers and documentary filmmaker Peter W. Klein.

History
Mount Pleasant owes much of its origins to a former stream and, because of it, developed much of its unique and rich character. The stream attracted a number of breweries from 1888 to 1912, hence it became known as Brewery Creek. In 1890, the first street cars arrived; as far south as 1st and Main. Brewery Creek, in conjunction with the connecting routes of Main and Kingsway, became the centre of industry and commercialism for the district of Mt. Pleasant. By 1897, there was a substantial population growth centred on Broadway and Main Street. The ability to commute to the City Centre and the industries of Brewery Creek and False Creek provided the draw for many working families that now populated the area below Broadway. In a sense, Mount Pleasant can be called Vancouver's "first suburb". 

The area high above False Creek was named "Mount Pleasant" in 1888, after the Irish birthplace of Jane Fortune Kemp the wife of Henry Valentine Edmonds. Edmonds, clerk of the municipal council in New Westminster, was the original owner of much of Mount Pleasant.

Demographics
As of 2016, Mt. Pleasant has 32,955 people. 11.3% of the population is under the age of 20; 49.3% is between 20 and 39; 30.9% is between 40 and 64; and 8.6% is 65 or older. 69.9% of Mt. Pleasant residents speak English as a first language, 7.7% speak a Chinese language, and 3.0% speak Tagalog. The median household income is $66,299 and 15.7% of its population lives in low-income households. The unemployment rate is 4.7%.

See also
Dude Chilling Park, a public art installation in the district, in Guelph Park

Notes

Footnotes

Brewery Creek Urban Study, 1985 by Barb Johnston and Denis Turco .  https://web.archive.org/web/20070214021230/http://www.lesliefield.com/bchs/

External links

 Mount Pleasant Electoral District
 City of Vancouver - Mount Pleasant Portal
 Mount Pleasant Community Calendar
 Mount Pleasant Business Improvement Association

Neighbourhoods in Vancouver